The Happiness Cage is a 1972 American science fiction film directed by Bernard Girard. The film stars Christopher Walken in his first starring role and Joss Ackland. The film was also known as The Mind Snatchers and The Demon Within.

Plot
After an altercation at a party given by his girlfriend, U.S. Army private James Reese is arrested for assault. Reese comes to the attention of Major, the head of Army program attempting to help those with terminal illnesses deal with their pain via a brain implant. Reese is determined to suffer from schizophrenia, making him an excellent candidate for the experimental program. Dr. Frederick (Joss Ackland) is trying to find a way to ease the aggressive nature of soldiers by developing a microchip to access the pleasure centers of their brains.

Reese is transferred to the Veterans Hospital in Frankfurt, where the experiments are being conducted by United States Army. However, the experiment has taken a darker turn.

The Army doctors are drilling into the patients’ skulls, attach wires, and alter their brains to create better soldiers and happier men — human robots. The patients are three veterans waiting to go into the operation clinic.  The implant is placed into Reese. Another soldier with the implant goes berserk, and Reese rips the wires and connections away from the soldier, the soldier dies. Reese escapes the hospital but is recaptured. He refuses to activate the implant, but the Major overrides his decision and activates it.

Reese, now docile and controlled by the Major, appears at a press conference as proof of the success of the program.

Reception
The film contains some brilliant performances, according to the review in The New York Times. They also state that the story works better as a play than a movie, although Walken's performance was found to be gripping.

The Encyclopedia of Science Fiction finds the movie limited by its low budget and its origins as a stage play, but noted it explores some of the same themes as the later A Clockwork Orange.

TV Guide found the movie had some very interesting parts, but that the movie was ultimately unsuccessful. It praised the work of Walken, but found the direction needs a more imaginative approach, and dialogue artificial.

Cast
Christopher Walken as Pvt. James H. Reese
Joss Ackland as Dr. Frederick
Ralph Meeker as The Major
Ronny Cox as Sgt. Boford Miles
Marco St. John as Lawrence Shannon
Bette Henritze as Anna Kraus
Susan Travers as Nurse Schroeder
Birthe Neumann as Lisa
Claus Nissen as Army Psychiatrist

Production
This film is based on Dennis J. Reardon’s acclaimed play The Happiness Cage, which opened at Joseph Papp Public Theater’s Newman Theater in New York on October 4, 1970.

References

External links

1972 films
1970s science fiction drama films
Films directed by Bernard Girard
American science fiction drama films
Films set in Frankfurt
Cinerama Releasing Corporation films
1972 drama films
1970s English-language films
1970s American films